Oomorphus floridanus is a species of leaf beetle in the family Chrysomelidae. It is found in the Caribbean and North America.

References

Further reading

 

Chrysomelidae
Articles created by Qbugbot
Beetles described in 1893